Proloricaria prolixa is a species of armored catfish endemic to Brazil where it occurs in the upper Paraná River drainage.  It is the only recognized species in its genus.  This species grows to a length of  SL.

References
 

Loricariidae
Fish described in 1978
Fish of South America
Fish of Brazil
Endemic fauna of Brazil
Taxa named by Isaäc J. H. Isbrücker
Taxa named by Han Nijssen
Monotypic freshwater fish genera
Catfish genera